Laura Fine (born 1967) is a Democratic member of the Illinois Senate for the 9th district.

Fine previously represented the 17th district of the Illinois House of Representatives from 2013 to 2019 and as Northfield Township Clerk. She grew up in Glenview and graduated from Indiana University with a B.A. in telecommunications, then produced, wrote, reported and anchored news shows. Fine received a master's degree in political science from Northeastern Illinois University, where she later taught courses in American Government and the Constitution. Married, Fine and her husband, Michael, have two sons.

On July 28, 2017, Fine announced her intention to run for the senate seat being vacated by Daniel Biss. After running unopposed in the primary, Fine won the 2018 general election. She took office on January 6, 2019, finishing out the remaining days of Biss' Senate term before starting her own on January 9. Jennifer Gong-Gershowitz, the winner of the 2018 general election for the 17th district, was appointed by local Democratic leaders and sworn into office that same day.

As of July 2022, Senator Fine is a member of the following Illinois Senate committees:

 Appropriations - Human Services Committee (SAPP-SAHS)
 (Chairwoman of) Behavioral and Mental Health Committee (SBMH)
 Environment and Conservation Committee (SNVR)
 Health Committee (SHEA)
 Healthcare Access and Availability Committee (SHAA)
 Insurance Committee (SINS)
 Redistricting - Northwest Cook County Committee (SRED-SRNC)
 (Chairwoman of) Subcommittee on Managed Care Organizations (SHEA-SMCO)
 Subcommittee on Medicaid (SHEA-SHMD)

References

External links
Representative Laura Fine (D) 17th District at the Illinois General Assembly
By session: 98th, 97th
Laura Fine for State Representative
 
Rep. Laura Fine at Illinois House Democrats
2012 Editorial board questionnaire at the Chicago Tribune

1967 births
Living people
People from Glenview, Illinois
Indiana University alumni
Democratic Party members of the Illinois House of Representatives
Democratic Party Illinois state senators
Northeastern Illinois University alumni
Women state legislators in Illinois
21st-century American politicians
21st-century American women politicians